Psilogramma lifuense is a moth of the  family Sphingidae. It is known from the Loyalty Islands.

It is a pale species, some specimens are nearly all white on the thorax and forewing. There are thin black discal streaks on the forewing upperside, often partly or totally obsolete. There is no distinct medio-costal brown area even in dark specimens. In dark specimens, the discal lines are pronounced; in pale ones the markings, including the proximal part of the apical black line, become indistinct.

References

Psilogramma
Loyalty Islands
Insects of New Caledonia
Moths described in 1894
Endemic fauna of New Caledonia